Trent Wiremu Kitahi Renata (born 13 May 1988) is a New Zealand rugby union player who currently is playing for Wellington in the Mitre 10 Cup.

Career

He made his Super Rugby debut for the  during the 2010 Super 14 season, scoring 10 points in 2 games whilst a member of the franchise's Wider Training Group.

An injury crisis in the  camp ahead of the 2013 Super Rugby season saw him named as a late replacement for Declan O'Donnell in the Dunedin side's main squad.

Renata has previously represented both New Zealand Under 20 and the Māori All Blacks.

Renata signed for Otago for the 2014 ITM Cup season, allowing him to play during the post-season for his Dunedin Club Rugby team, Dunedin.

Renata signed for the Tasman Makos for the 2015 ITM Cup season.

Renata is now currently playing for Wellington in the 2017 Mitre 10 Cup season.

References

1988 births
New Zealand rugby union players
New Zealand Māori rugby union players
Māori All Blacks players
Chiefs (rugby union) players
Highlanders (rugby union) players
Waikato rugby union players
Otago rugby union players
Tasman rugby union players
Rugby union fullbacks
Rugby union wings
Rugby union players from Hamilton, New Zealand
People educated at Hamilton Boys' High School
Living people